Siemirowice  is a village in the administrative district of Gmina Cewice, within Lębork County, Pomeranian Voivodeship, in northern Poland. It is located in the ethnocultural region of Kashubia in the historic region of Pomerania.

The village has a population of 1,909.

The 44th Naval Air Base of the Polish Navy is based in Siemirowice.

Sights
In a forest near Siemirowice there is a barrow cemetery.

Education
There is a small school in Siemirowice. Students aged 6 to 12 years attend it. They learn three additional languages - Kashubian, English and German.

References

Villages in Lębork County